Bethel Music is an American music label and worship movement from Redding, California, originating out of Bethel Church where they started making music in 2001. Bethel Music has grown from being a local church music ministry to a global outreach made up of a collective of songwriters, artists and musicians. They focus on producing worship songs and albums that are largely written and recorded by members of their Artist Collective.

History 

From 2009 to 2013, Bethel Music rapidly grew from being a relatively small local church music ministry to becoming a fully-fledged record label and publishing company, featuring songwriters and worship leaders based out of Bethel Church in Redding, California.

In January 2015, Bethel Music launched their Artist Collective, expanding their group of locally based artists to include North Carolinians Josh Baldwin and Jonathan and Melissa Helser. Later that year, in May, they included Cory Asbury, formerly of the International House of Prayer. In September 2015, it was announced that Leeland would also be joining the Collective. On November 2, 2016, Bethel Music issued a press release announcing that they and longtime member William Matthews had agreed that William would no longer be a part of the Bethel Music Collective. Just days later, it was announced that Sean Feucht would officially join the artist collective of Bethel Church.

Members 

Members of Bethel Music, as of July 2022, include:

 Brian Johnson
 Jenn Johnson
 Bethany Wohrle
 Emmy Rose
 John Wilds
 Josh Baldwin
 Kristene DiMarco
 Melissa Helser
 Jonathan David Helser
 Paul and Hannah McClure
 David Funk
 Zahriya Zachary
 Joey Allison

Production history

Albums

Albums that have been produced by Bethel Music include:

 Undone (Brian & Jenn Johnson with Leah Märi) (2001)
 We Believe (Brian & Jenn Johnson) (2006)
 All I Have Needed (Leah Märi) (2010)
 Here Is Love (2010)
 Love Came Down - Live Acoustic Worship in the Studio (Brian Johnson) (2010)
 Be Lifted High (2011)
 The Loft Sessions (2012)
 For the Sake of the World (2012)
 Without Words (2013)
 Tides (2013)
 Discover Bethel Music (2013)
 Tides Live (2014)
 The Undoing (Steffany Gretzinger) (2014)
 On the Shores – Rerelease (Jonathan David & Melissa Helser) (2014)
 You Make Me Brave (2014)
 We Will Not Be Shaken (2015)
 Without Words: Synesthesia (2015)
 Brave New World (Amanda Cook) (2015)
 Come Alive (Bethel Music Kids) (2015)
 Have It All (2016)
 Invisible (Leeland) (2016)
 Beautiful Surrender (Jonathan David & Melissa Helser) (2016)
 After All These Years (Brian & Jenn Johnson) (2017)
 Starlight (2017)
 The War Is Over (Josh Baldwin) (2017)
 After All These Years (Instrumental) (Brian & Jenn Johnson) (2017)
 Where His Light Was (Kristene DiMarco) (2017)
 More (Jeremy Riddle) (2017)
 Reckless Love (Cory Asbury) (2018)
 Blackout (Steffany Gretzinger) (2018)
 Bright Ones (Bright Ones) (2018)
 Moments: Mighty Sound (2018)
 Wild (Sean Feucht) (2018)
 Victory (2019)
 Bethel Music en Español (2019)
 House on a Hill (Amanda Lindsey Cook) (2019)
 The Way Home (Paul & Hannah McClure) (2019)
 Without Words: Genesis (2019)
 Peace (2020)
 Revival's in the Air (2020)
 Homecoming (2021)
 Homecoming (Español) (2021)
 Peace, Vol. II (2021)
 "The Land I'm Livin' In" (Jonathan David and Melissa Helser) (2022)
 Kingdom Come (Rebecca St. James) (2022)
 The Field  (Kristene DiMarco) (2022)
 Simple (2022)
 Where the Glory Is  (Josh Baldwin) (2022)

Singles 

 "Come to Me" (Jenn Johnson) (2011)
 "Chasing You" (Jenn Johnson) (2013)
 "You Make Me Brave" (Amanda Cook) (2014)
 "It is Well" (Kristene DiMarco) (2015)
 "No Longer Slaves" (Jonathan David & Melissa Helser) (2015)
 "Have It All" (Brian Johnson) (2016)
 "Take Courage" (Kristene DiMarco) (2017)
 "Living Hope" (Bethany Worhle) (2018)
 "Stand in Your Love" (Josh Baldwin) (2018)
 "Raise a Hallelujah" (Jonathan David Helser and Melissa Helser) (2019)
 "Alabaster Heart" (Kalley) (2019)
 "Goodness of God" (Jenn Johnson) (2019)
 "God of Revival" (Brian Johnson and Jenn Johnson) (2020)
 "We Praise You" (Brandon Lake) (2020)
 "Egypt" (Cory Asbury) (2020)
 "Touch of Heaven" / "Alabaster Heart" (David Funk) (2021)
 "Too Good To Not Believe" (Brandon Lake) (2021)
 "Homecoming" (Cory Asbury and Gable Price) (2021)

Releases and reception

Bethel Music's live album, We Will Not Be Shaken was produced by Bobby Strand and Chris Greely, and introduces 11 original songs led by the Bethel Music Artist Collective, including Brian Johnson, Jenn Johnson, Hunter Thompson, Amanda Cook and Matt Stinton, as well as debut artists Kalley Heiligenthal, Hannah McClure, Paul McClure, Jonathan David Helser and Melissa Helser.
We Will Not Be Shaken was intended as a catalyst for other worship communities to remain steadfast in their faith no matter what the circumstances. The title track was inspired in a spontaneous moment of worship during a Sunday service and highlights God's enduring promises during times of trouble.

CCM Magazine also lauded the album, saying that there "is quite a bit of buzz surrounding the anticipated release from Bethel Music...and it's all warranted. This is an album that simply soars above the rest... Every track holds a different aspect of beauty...flawless." Christian Review Magazine gave it a five-star review saying the album is an "out-and-out worship release on which each track contains lyrics that praise and glorify God, and point toward His faithfulness, love and grace."
NewReleaseTuesday.com for its part loves the "anointed lyrics that are both emotionally stirring and grounded in truth alongside musical atmospheres that quiet the soul while simultaneously clearing space for God to speak."

You Make Me Brave was recorded live at Redding's Civic Auditorium during Bethel Church's women's conference in the summer of 2013. The album features female worship leaders Jenn Johnson, Kari Jobe, Amanda Cook, Kristene DiMarco and more. According to The Church Collective, it is "classic Bethel", with 3 of the 12 tracks recorded during spontaneous moments of worship. Their reviewer goes on to say that "the worship leaders from Bethel seriously outdo themselves with their musical influence, heavy synth, and wisely put-together arrangements of songs." Produced by Gabriel Solomon Wilson (www.GabrielWilson.net), & Daniel Mackenzie.

On March 11, Bethel Music released Have It All, a live album recorded at Bethel Church on weekend services.  The album features 14 songs led by Brian & Jenn Johnson, Jeremy Riddle, Steffany Gretzinger, Amanda Cook, William Matthews, Jonathan Helser & more. The album was birthed as a "declaration of the faith that becomes proved in us when we entrust our every moment into our Father’s hands – the hands that carefully formed us and now lead us into fullness of life." The album was nominated for Worship Album of the Year and Recorded Music Packaging Award at the 2016 GMA Dove Awards, but won neither.

Starlight is the first album recorded live on tour, a follow-up to You Make Me Brave (2014). The album is made up of 14 songs sung by Jenn Johnson, Steffany Gretzinger, Amanda Cook, Kristene DiMarco, Kalley Heiligenthal, Melissa Helser, Hannah McClure, and Francesca Battistelli. The message of the album is that, "like stars placed in the universe, no distance separates us from Him."

Moments: Mighty Sound is the first spontaneous album recorded live at WorshipU on Campus and included worship leaders Brian & Jenn Johnson, Steffany Gretzinger, Kalley Heiligenthal, Melissa Helser,  Molly Skaggs, Amanda Cook, Jeremy Riddle, Leeland Mooring, Reuben Morgan, Brittany Mondesir, and Paul McClure.

Victory was recorded live at Bethel Church. The 14-track album was the start of the promotional Victory Tour in which the Bethel Music Collective traveled across the United States. The album was recorded during several hardships faced by the Bethel community, including the near death of the two-year-old son of Bethel Music's CEO Joel Taylor and the Carr Fire near Redding, California and the surrounding areas.

Events and tours

Bethel Music regularly tours both in the U.S. and internationally. Artists from the Bethel Music family visited South Africa for the first time in March 2015 and led evenings of worship in Johannesburg, Pretoria, Durban, Cape Town and Port Elizabeth.

In October 2016, Bethel artists Brian and Jenn Johnson, Amanda Cook, Steffany Gretzinger, Jonathan and Melissa Helser, Kalley Heiligenthal, Kristene DiMarco, Paul and Hannah McClure, and Josh Baldwin embarked on a two-week tour to record a live album with guest worship leader Francesca Battistelli. On March 1, 2017, it was announced that the album would be titled Starlight, with pre-orders beginning on March 17 and the official release of the album to be on April 7.

Achievements
Bethel Music's songs were among the most played contemporary worship music in American churches in 2019 and their albums have reached the Billboard 200 multiple times.  Bethel Music have many songs with tens of millions of views on YouTube, and two with over 100 million views as 2019. Their songs and albums have been among the most streamed and downloaded Christian music on Spotify and iTunes.

Awards and nominations

Billboard Music Awards 

!Ref.
|-
| rowspan="2" | 2020
| Victory
| Top Christian Album
| 
| rowspan="2" | 
|-
| "Raise a Hallelujah"
| Top Christian Song
| 
|-
| 2021
| Peace
| Top Christian Album
| 
| 
|}

GMA Dove Awards 

|-
| 2015
| We Will Not Be Shaken
| Worship Album of the Year
| 
|-
| rowspan="5" | 2016
| rowspan="2" | "No Longer Slaves"
| Song of the Year
| 
|-
| Worship Song of the Year
| 
|-
| rowspan="2" | Have It All
| Worship Album of the Year
| 
|-
| Recorded Music Packaging of the Year
| 
|-
| Without Words: Synesthesia
| Instrumental Album of the Year
| 
|-
| rowspan="3" | 2017
| rowspan="2" | "The Lion and the Lamb"
| Song of the Year
| 
|-
| Worship Song of the Year
| 
|-
| "Ever Be"
| Worship Song of the Year
| 
|-
| rowspan="3" | 2019
| "Raise a Hallelujah"
| Worship Recorded Song of the Year
| 
|-
| rowspan="2" | Victory
| Worship Album of the Year
| 
|-
| Recorded Music Packaging of the Year
| 
|-
| rowspan="3" | 2020
| "Goodness of God"
| Worship Recorded Song of the Year
| 
|-
| Peace
| Worship Album of the Year
| 
|-
| Without Words: Genesis
| Instrumental Album of the Year
| 
|-
| rowspan="2" | 2021
| rowspan="2" | Revival's in the Air
| Worship Album of the Year
| 
|-
| Recorded Music Packaging of the Year
| 
|-
| rowspan="2" | 2022
| "You're Gonna Be OK"
| Inspirational Recorded Song of the Year
|  
|-
| Homecoming
| Worship Album of the Year
| 
|-
|}

References

External links 

 

Musical groups from California
Musical groups established in 2001
Evangelical Christian record labels
Performers of contemporary worship music